Days Go By may refer to:
Days Go By (Daryl Braithwaite album), a 2017 compilation album by Daryl Braithwaite
"Days Go By" (Dirty Vegas song), 2001 
Days Go By (Keith Urban album), a compilation album by Keith Urban
"Days Go By" (Keith Urban song), 2004
Days Go By (The Offspring album), a ninth studio album by The Offspring
"Days Go By" (The Offspring song), title track from the album above
"Days Go By", a song by Not By Choice from their 2004 album Secondhand Opinions
"Days Go By", a 2005 song by High Contrast
"Days Go By", a song by Janet Jackson from the Japanese version of her 2006 album 20 Y.O.

See also 
 "As Days Go By", song used as the main theme for the television sitcom Family Matters